The 75th Infantry Division (75-ya Pekhotnaya Diviziya) was an infantry formation of the Russian Imperial Army.

Organization
1st Brigade
297th Infantry Regiment
298th Infantry Regiment
2nd Brigade
299th Infantry Regiment
300th Infantry Regiment

References

Infantry divisions of the Russian Empire